The Shenandoah Valley Governor's School is one of Virginia's 18 state-initiated magnet Governor's Schools.  It is a part-time school where 11th and 12th grade students take advanced classes in the morning (receiving their remaining classes from their home high school).

Curriculum
There are two curricula at SVGS:

The curriculum for the Math Science and Technology program includes the following college prep and dual enrollment classes: Research and Engineering, Robotics, Advanced Technology, Astrophysics, AP Computer Science, Pre Calculus, AP Calculus, DE Calculus, DE Discrete Mathematics, AP Statistics, DE Molecular Biology, AP Environmental Science, DE Environmental Chemistry, DE Physics, and AP Chemistry.

The curriculum for the Arts and Humanities program includes DE Acting I (through JMU), Acting II, DE Introduction to Theatre (through JMU), Advanced Dramatic Theories and Criticism, advanced art classes, DE Humanities 111/112, DE Communication, DE Psychology, and DE The Humanities in Western Culture (through BRCC).

Contributing schools 
 Buffalo Gap High School
 Stuarts Draft High School
 Fort Defiance High School
 Riverheads High School
 Staunton High School
 Waynesboro High School
 Wilson Memorial High School

Extracurricular activities 
Electric Vehicle Team
Robotics Team
Network Team
Envirothon Team
Outreach (with elementary and middle schoolers)

External links 
 Shenandoah Valley Governor's School

NCSSS schools
Public high schools in Virginia
Magnet schools in Virginia
Schools in Augusta County, Virginia
Educational institutions established in 1993
1993 establishments in Virginia